The Saint Barbara Altarpiece may refer to:
Saint Barbara Altarpiece (Master Francke)
Saint Barbara Altarpiece (Palma Vecchio)